Lauvøya (sometimes Løvøya) is an island in the municipality of Flatanger in Trøndelag county, Norway.  The island sits just off the mainland coast, across from the village of Lauvsnes.  The main church for northern Flatanger, Løvøy Church, is located on the island.  The  island has been connected to the mainland by a bridge since 1990.  The island has several homes on it and has become an important recreational area for the municipality.

See also
List of islands of Norway

References

Islands of Trøndelag
Flatanger